The Campeonato Argentino de Rugby 1983 was an Argentine rugby competition in which Buenos Aires defeated Unión de Rugby de Cuyo for the championship.

Rugby Union in Argentina in 1983

National
 The Buenos Aires Champsionship was won by San Isidro Club
 The Cordoba Province Championship was won by Tala
 The North-East Championship was won by Los Tarcos

International
 The Argentine national team visited Australia and obtain an historical win in the first test

 As usual, Argentina won easily the "Campeonato Sudamericano "

Poule 1

Poule 2

Poule 3

Poule 4

Interzone

Semifinals

Third place final

Final 

 Cuyo: 15.Luis Chaluleu (Guillermo Morgan), 14.Francisco Lola, 13. Carlos Cippittelli 12.Guillermo Carbonnell, 11.Alejandro González, 10.Jorge Curto, 9.Pedro Basile (cap.), 8.Gilberto Lago Suarez, 7.Sergio Elorga, 6.Luis Heyde, 5.Juan Floramo, 4.Alejandro Collado (Alberto Mantilla), 3.Fernando Rbello, 2.Mario Cichitti, 1.Alberto Gutierrez. 
Buenos Aires: 15. Martín Sansot, 14.Marcelo Campo, 13. Rafael Madero, 12.Marcelo Loffreda, 11. José Maria Palma, 10 Hugo Porta (cap.), 9.Alfredo Soares Gache, 8. Tomas Petersen, 7.Alejandro Schiavio, 6. Marcos Baeck, 5.Gonzalo Gasso (Eduardo Laje), 4. Gabriel Travaglini, 3.Fernando Morel, 2.Andrés Courreges, 1. Pablo Devoto

External links 
 Memorias de la UAR 1983
  Francesco Volpe, Paolo Pacitti (Author), Rugby 2000, GTE Gruppo Editorale (1999)

Campeonato Argentino de Rugby
Argentina
Campeonato